Convents in early modern Europe (1500–1800) absorbed many unmarried and disabled women as nuns. France deemed convents as an alternative to prisons for unmarried or rebellious women and children. It was also where young girls were educated as they waited to be married.

During the 17th century, over 80,000 women lived and were educated in convents. Nuns never received monetary compensation. They served without salary, surviving on charity. Although many young girls lived in the convents, they were not nuns. Every European city had at least one convent and some had dozens or more.

Joining convents 
Women joined convents for a variety of reasons. Although a dowry was paid to the church it was not as expensive as a wedding dowry, so many families sent their daughters to convents to escape dowry expenses. Women had fewer choices than in the twenty-first century—marriage or convent life. Thus, the structure of convents kept young women occupied and preserved their chastity until they reached marrying age.

Nuns dedicated their lives to the convent, the institution of marriage to God, and took three solemn vows: a life of chastity, poverty and obedience. According to the church, the life of a cloistered nun was deemed to be the most honorable existence for women. During the Catholic Reformation, nuns recruited and cloistered new members of the church.

The Catholic Church targeted prostitutes for convent life or helped them marry, in the hope that the women would leave their sinful lives. By serving Christ, they would purify themselves and gain salvation.

References

Christianity in the early modern period
Convents in Europe